Sir Don is a song written and recorded by Australian country singer John Williamson. The song is a tribute to Australian cricketer, Donald Bradman and $1 from each sale went towards the Bradman Museum. The song was released in June 1996 as the lead single from Williamson's thirteenth studio album Pipe Dream and peaked at number 72 on the ARIA Charts.

Following Bradman's death in February 2001, Williamson performed the track at Bradman's Memorial Service at St Peter's Cathedral, Adelaide. The original scraps of paper this song was written on have been framed and hang in the Bradman Museum at Bowral.

Track listing

Charts

Release history

References 

John Williamson (singer) songs
Songs about Don Bradman
Cricket music
Cultural depictions of Don Bradman
1996 songs
1996 singles